Lex Luthor: Drop of Doom is a drop tower located at Six Flags Magic Mountain in Valencia, California. The ride is integrated onto the existing Superman: Escape from Krypton tower structure.

History

Construction and opening
On August 25, 2011, Six Flags Magic Mountain released a "GoBigCam" video. The video concluded hinting at a possible new attraction in 2012 to be installed on Superman: Escape from Krypton. On September 1, 2011, Six Flags Magic Mountain officially announced that they would be adding Intamin drop towers to the sides of the Superman: Escape from Krypton tower.

On February 5, 2012, Superman: Escape from Krypton closed, so that the park could start construction of Lex Luthor: Drop of Doom on the coaster. Superman: Escape from Krypton was expected to reopen when Lex Luthor: Drop of Doom opened to the public. In middle to late March, the electrical part of the ride was constructed to operate the drop tower. Pieces for the lower part of drop tower arrived at the park on April 2, 2012.

On April 12, 2012, pieces of the ride were taken up in the air by helicopter above the Superman tower ( in the air) to connect the ride pieces to the tower. During the first week of May, vertical pieces for Lex Luthor: Drop of Doom were attached to the Superman tower. By the second week of May, all the pieces for the ride were attached to the tower. By May 30, the ride gondolas were placed onto the tower to start testing. Testing began on June 22, two weeks before it opened to the public on July 7, 2012.

Operation
During the 2018 season, Lex Luthor: Drop of Doom offered a virtual reality experience for a limited time. The experience would be called DC Super Heroes: Drop of Doom VR. Riders had the option to wear Samsung Gear VR headsets, powered by Oculus to create a 360-degree, 3D experience while riding. The experience put guests in a battle between Lex Luthor, Superman and Wonder Woman. Lex Luthor would use his anti-gravity ray gun to levitate guests above the skyscrapers as the two heroes battled the Lex Bots. At the end, the anti-gravity ray gun exploded, causing guests to plummet towards the streets. This was the second attraction at Six Flags Magic Mountain to be equipped with virtual reality, with the first one being The New Revolution.

Ride experience

Queue
Guests enter the Lexcorp headquarters, the lair of Lex Luthor. Inside, there are posters advertising Luthor's different corporations such as LexAir, LexPower, Lexcom, and Lexcorp. One wall features blueprints for Lexcorp weapons. One wall features a picture of Lex and the company goal. At the far end is a fake elevator and Lex Luthor's Power suit, his weapon for fighting Superman. From time to time Lex can be heard welcoming guests and thanking them for volunteering to test his newest project. These recordings often feature ominous sayings to tell the guests that something is wrong. Guests then move through a secure access hallway, passing company mottos and offices. This hallway even has a door labeled Research & Development, which is the Flash Pass entrance. Heading outside, guests walk down a short pathway before reaching the loading area. The ride has a single rider line, which is located near the exit. Guests will stand in front of the chain and wait for the ride operator to direct them to the next available seat.

Ride

Lex Luthor: Drop of Doom consists of two towers, with each mounted to a lateral flank of the Superman: Escape from Krypton structure. Both rides feature a single floorless gondola seating eight-abreast. Riders are harnessed in by over-the-shoulder restraints. As the gondolas reach the apex, riders are greeted with a pre-recorded audio spiel from Lex Luthor. Mass of the gondolas is  without any riders.

When the Superman: Escape from Krypton and Lex Luthor: Drop of Doom operate simultaneously, the steel framework tower that supports both rides is likely to sway as much as  side to side.

Records
Lex Luthor: Drop of Doom was the tallest drop tower ride in the world at the time of its opening, having superseded The Giant Drop located at Dreamworld on July 7, 2012. Its record was broken on July 4, 2014, by Zumanjaro: Drop of Doom when it opened at Six Flags Great Adventure.

Height requirements
In order for guests to ride Lex Luthor: Drop of Doom, riders must be at least 48 inches (121 centimeters). Each seat includes an individual over the shoulder restraint.  Due to the aggressiveness, very high height and very fast speed of this ride, it is not labeled by Six Flags Magic Mountain as a family friendly ride. The park labels the ride as maximum in the intensity thrill rating. Guests who have acrophobia, high blood pressure, diabetes, epilepsy, are pregnant, or have other health problems are forbidden from riding this attraction.

See also
 2012 in amusement parks
 Dreamworld Tower
 Superman: Escape from Krypton
 Zumanjaro: Drop of Doom, a drop tower with a similar name at another Six Flags park, Six Flags Great Adventure

References

External links
 

Drop tower rides
Amusement rides introduced in 2012
Amusement rides manufactured by Intamin
Six Flags attractions
Six Flags Magic Mountain
DC Comics in amusement parks
Superman in other media
Warner Bros. Global Brands and Experiences attractions
2012 establishments in California